The Venucia R50 is a subcompact hatchback produced by the Chinese manufacturer Venucia since 2012, with the subcompact sedan version called the Venucia D50, and the crossover version called the Venucia D50X. The Venucia R50, R50X, and D50 are all based on the first generation Nissan Tiida featuring redesigned front and rear end styling.

Overview

The Venucia D50 was launched on China car market in May 2012 as Venucia's first product. The Venucia R50 is available with a 1.6 litre engine producing 116 hp and 153nm with an option of either a 4-speed automatic or a 5-speed manual gearbox.

Introduced in September 2012, the Venucia R50 is available with a 1.6 litre engine producing 116 hp and 153nm with an option of either a 4-speed automatic or a 5-speed manual gearbox.

R50X
The Venucia R50X was launched on the China car market in 2013 with prices starting from 79,800 yuan and ending at 91,800 yuan. The Venucia R50X is the crossover variant of the Venucia R50 hatchback.

References

External links 

R50
2010s cars
Cars introduced in 2012
Subcompact cars
Front-wheel-drive vehicles
Hatchbacks
Cars of China